Rachel Blau DuPlessis (born December 14, 1941) is an American poet and essayist, known as a feminist critic and scholar with a special interest in modernist and contemporary poetry. Her work has been widely anthologized.

Early life 
DuPlessis was born in Brooklyn, New York in 1941 to Joseph L. and Eleanor Blau; her father was a professor, and her mother was a librarian. She received her BA from Barnard College in 1963, and her MA and PhD from Columbia University in 1964 and 1970 respectively. Her dissertation project was titled The Endless Poem: Paterson of William Carlos Williams and The Pisan Cantos of Ezra Pound.

Career

Teaching 

DuPlessis taught literature and creative writing at Temple University in Philadelphia, Pennsylvania, from 1974 to 2011; she has been professor emerita since 2011. In 2012, she was a Distinguished Visitor at University of Auckland. DuPlessis has also taught at Trenton State College (now known as The College of New Jersey), Rutgers University, Columbia University, Université de Lille III (France), and Rijksuniversiteit-Gent (Belgium). She also held an appointment with the National Humanities Center in North Carolina and a residency at Bellagio sponsored by the Rockefeller Foundation.

Drafts Project

In conjunction with teaching and editing projects, DuPlessis has been writing her "poem of a life," called "Drafts." Among others, poet Ron Silliman has referred to DuPlessis's poem Drafts as a "life poem":More than any other text, Drafts has made me understand the difference between the longpoem and the life poem, and I read Drafts, like (Zukofsky's “A”), like The Cantos, like Bev Dahlen’s A Reading, like my own project, as an instance of the latter.
  Since 1985, Rachel Blau DuPlessis has been composing this "endless poem" in canto-like sections, grouped in nineteen units. Their themes involve: history, gender, mourning and hope. The first two numbers of Drafts initially appeared in Leland Hickman’s  journal, Temblor, two years before being collected into a volume entitled Tabula Rosa, published by Peter Ganick’s Potes & Poets Press.

Since then, DuPlessis's "life poem" project is collected in (as of March 2017): Drafts 1-38, Toll (Wesleyan University Press, 2001) and Drafts 39-57, Pledge, with Draft, Unnumbered: Précis (Salt Publishing, 2004), Torques: Drafts 58-76 (Salt Publishing, 2007), Pitch: Drafts 77-95 (Salt Publishing, 2010), and Surge: Drafts 96-114 (Salt Publishing, 2013).

Personal life 
DuPlessis is married to Robert Saint-Cyr DuPlessis, the Isaac H. Clothier Professor Emeritus of History and International Relations at Swarthmore College, and has two children.

Awards and honors 
DuPlessis has been the recipient of numerous awards and honors, including grants from the National Endowment for the Humanities (NEH), Temple University, the Pennsylvania Council on the Arts, and the Fund for Poetry. In 2002, she was awarded a Pew Fellowship in The Arts as well as the Roy Harvey Pearce/Archive for New Poetry Prize for lifetime contribution to American poetry and literary scholarship.

Works by DuPlessis

Poetry
 Wells, Montemora (New York, NY), 1980
 Gypsy/Moth, Coincidence Press (Oakland, CA), 1984
 Tabula Rosa, Potes and Poets Press (Elmwood, CT), 1987
 Draft X: Letters, Singing Horse Press (Philadelphia, PA), 1991
 Drafts 3-14, Potes and Poets Press (Elmwood, CT), 1991
 Essais: Quatre poèmes, Editions Créaphis (Bar-le-Duc, France), 1996
 Drafts 15-XXX, The Fold, Potes and Poets Press (Elmwood, CT), 1997
 Renga: Draft 32, Beautiful Swimmer Press (Philadelphia, PA), 1998
 Drafts 1-38, Toll, Wesleyan University Press (Middletown, CT), 2001
 Draft, Unnumbered: Précis, Nomados (Vancouver, British Columbia, Canada), 2003
 Drafts 39-57, Pledge with Draft, Unnumbered: Précis, Salt Publishing (Cambridge, England), 2004.
 Torques, Drafts 58-76, Salt Publishing (Cambridge, England), 2007
 Pitch: Drafts 77-95, Salt Publishing (Cambridge, England), 2010
 The Collage Poems of Drafts, Salt Publishing (Cambridge, England), 2011
 Surge: Drafts 96-114, Salt Publishing (Cambridge, England), 2013
 Interstices, Subpress (Cambridge, MA), 2014
 Graphic Novella, Xexoxial Editions (West Lima, WI), 2015
 Poesis, Little Red Leaves Textile Editions (Houston: TX), 2016
 Days and Works, Ahsahta Press (Boise, ID), 2017

Other
 Writing Beyond the Ending: Narrative Strategies of Twentieth-Century Women Writers (Indiana University Press, 1985)  OCLC 230821945
 H.D: The Career of that Struggle (The Harvester Press, 1986)  OCLC 868376073
 Editor, The Selected Letters of George Oppen (Duke University Press, 1990)  OCLC 859655652
 Editor, with Susan Stanford Friedman, Signets: Reading H.D. (University of Wisconsin Press, 1990)  OCLC 24724278
 The Pink Guitar: Writing as Feminist Practice (Routledge, 1990)  OCLC 715473801
 Genders, Races, and Religious Cultures in Modern American Poetry, 1908–1934 (Cambridge University Press, 2001)  OCLC 958550498
 Blue Studios: Poetry and Its Cultural Work (University of Alabama Press, 2006)  OCLC 425970102
 Purple Passages: Pound, Eliot, Zukofsky, Olson, Creeley, and the Ends of Patriarchal Poetry (University of Iowa Press, 2012)  OCLC 754389718

References

Selected criticism 
 Jaussen, Paul. "The Poetics of Midrash in Rachel Blau DuPlessis's Drafts." Contemporary Literature, vol. 53, no. 1, 2012, pp. 114–142. doi:10.1353/cli.2012.0004
 Harrington, Joseph. "Purple Passages: Pound, Eliot, Zukofsky, Olson, Creeley, and the Ends of Patriarchal Poetry by Rachel Blau DuPlessis (Review)." Modernism/modernity, vol. 20, no. 2, 2013, pp. 397–399 doi:10.1353/mod.2013.0043

External links
Author Homepage at EPC
Author Homepage
The Gendered Marvelous essay by DuPlessis on Barbara Guest
Standing Corporeally in One’s Time essay by DuPlessis on Anne Waldman
"Draft 42: Epistle, Studios" poem by DuPlessis at Jacket Magazine
Statement for Pores on-line essay by DuPlessis for Pores, a journal which describes itself as AN AVANT-GARDIST JOURNAL OF POETICS RESEARCH
Excerpts from Graphic Novella in Cordite Poetry Review
Manhood and its Poetic Projects essay at Jacket Magazine, with the subtitle: "The construction of masculinity in the counter-cultural poetry of the U.S. 1950s".
DuPlessis Feature at Poetica.net On the Homepage can be found links to biographical information, a poem Tabula Rosa (Chapter II, Drafts) and a brief piece or "aphoristic-essay" titled Working Notes
Rachel Blau DuPlessis Papers. Yale Collection of American Literature, Beinecke Rare Book and Manuscript Library, Yale University.

1941 births
Living people
Modernist women writers
Objectivist poets
Feminist artists
Temple University faculty
Columbia Graduate School of Arts and Sciences alumni
Writers from Brooklyn
Pew Fellows in the Arts
American women poets
Barnard College alumni
American women academics
21st-century American women